Evalina is a small genus of sea snails, pyramidellid gastropod mollusks in the tribe Chrysallidini within the family Pyramidellidae.

The genus has both Recent and fossil members.

Life habits
Little is known about the biology of the members of this genus. As is true of most members of the Pyramidellidae sensu lato, they are ectoparasites.

Species 
Species within the genus Evalina include:
 Evalina americana Dall & Bartsch, 1904 - type species, as Odostomia (Evalina) americana
 Evalina nishiana (Yokoyama, 1927)
 Evalina peasei (Dautzenberg & Bouge, 1933)
 Evalina waikikiensis (Pilsbry, 1918)
 Evalina winkleyi (Bartsch, 1909)
 ...

References

Pyramidellidae